Alberti may refer to:

Leon Battista Alberti, the Renaissance architect

Places
 Alberti Partido, a partido of Buenos Aires Province, Argentina
 Alberti, Buenos Aires, the main town of the partido
 Alberti (Buenos Aires Underground), a railway station

Other uses
 Alberti (surname)
 Alberti bass, a musical accompaniment figuration, usually in the left hand on a keyboard instrument
 Alberti cipher, an early polyalphabetic cipher (late 15th century)
 Alberti (family), Florentine political family

See also
 Albertis (disambiguation)
 Albertoni, a surname
 D'Albertis (disambiguation)